Aldgate station may refer to:

Aldgate railway station, Adelaide, a railway station in Adelaide, South Australia
Aldgate tube station, a station on the London Underground, London, United Kingdom
Aldgate East tube station, another London Underground station